Redden may refer to:

People with the surname
Barry Redden (b. 1960), American football player
Billy Redden (b. 1956), American actor in Deliverance
Chrissy Redden (born 1966), Canadian Olympic cyclist
Jack Redden Australian Rules football player
James A. Redden (1929-2020), U.S. District Court Judge
Jarrad Redden Australian Rules football player
Monroe Minor Redden (1901–1987), U.S. Congressman
Wade Redden (b. 1977), Canadian ice hockey player

Places
Redden, Oklahoma, United States
Redden a village in Somerset, UK

See also
Reddin
Redding (disambiguation)
Reding (disambiguation)
Redington (disambiguation)
Reading (disambiguation)